Fagne-Famenne is a natural region in southern Belgium and northern France. It consists of The Fagne or la Fagne west of the river Meuse, and Famenne to the east. The two regions are often grouped together because they are quite similar both geographically and naturally.

Natural regions of Belgium
Areas of Belgium
Forestry in Belgium
Wetlands of Belgium
Geographical, historical and cultural regions of France
Forestry in France
Wetlands of Metropolitan France
Regions of Wallonia
Landforms of Wallonia
Landforms of Hainaut (province)
Landforms of Liège Province
Landforms of Luxembourg (Belgium)
Landforms of Namur (province)
Landforms of Ardennes (department)
Landforms of Nord (French department)